Inkosi, otherwise appearing as Nkosi, is the Zulu and Xhosa for chieftain in Southern Africa. Inkosikazi is the equivalent term for a chieftess.

An inkosi that has authority over several subordinate inkosis is traditionally referred to as an Inkosi Enkhulu (lit. "Great Chieftain"). This version of the title is typically translated as king in English.

People who bear or once bore the title
 Albert Lutuli
 Mandla Mandela
 George Matanzima
 Kaiser Matanzima
 Qaqambile Matanzima
 Falo Mgudlwa
 Mangosuthu Buthelezi

See also
 Induna

Zulu words and phrases
 African noble titles